Anatoly Nikolayevich Bulgakov (born 18 July 1944) is a Russian professional football coach and a former player.

Bulgakov played in the Soviet First League with FC Torpedo Taganrog.

External links
 Profile at Footballfacts.ru

1944 births
Living people
Soviet footballers
FC Elista players
Soviet football managers
Russian football managers
FC Taganrog players
Association football midfielders